Ruphin Kayembe-Tshiabu (born December 9, 1992) is a Congolese-Belgian  professional basketball player.

Professional career
In 2012, Kayembe-Tshiabu started his professional career in Slovenia with KK Maribor.

During the 2021-22 season, he played for Champagne Châlons-Reims of the LNB Pro A.

DR Congo national team
Kayembe-Tshiabu played for the DR Congo national team on several occasions.
He played 3 games at the 2019 FIBA World Cup qualification where he averaged 8.7 points and 5.3 rebounds per game.

References

External links
 at basketball.eurobasket.com
 at basketball.realgm.com
 at kzs.si
 at fiba.com

1992 births
Living people
Belgian men's basketball players
Democratic Republic of the Congo expatriate basketball people in France
Democratic Republic of the Congo expatriates in Slovenia
Democratic Republic of the Congo men's basketball players
Small forwards
Basketball players from Kinshasa